The Taegu Broadcasting Corporation Hangul: 대구 방송() is a regional television and radio broadcasting company that is based in Daegu (Taegu), South Korea, and are eventually broadcasting as an affiliate of Seoul Broadcasting System (SBS). The station were originally established on August 10, 1994, and had first started its demo emissions, although it were later beginning its test transmissions on October 7, 1994, and then, it had officially commenced its official broadcasts on May 14, 1995.

Stations

 Television
 Channel - Ch. 15 (LCN 6-1)
 Launched - May 14, 1995
 Call Sign - HLDE-DTV
 FM radio (Dream FM)
 Frequency - 99.3 MHz (Daegu, Gyeongju, Gumi), 99.7 MHz (Pohang, Yeongdeok, Uljin), 106.5 MHz (Andong, Yeongju, Seongseo, Jisan, Beommul)
 Launched - December 1, 1997
 Call Sign - HLDE-FM

Tie-up stations
 Hiroshima Home Television (Hiroshima, Japan; since 2002)
 KCOP-TV (Los Angeles, United States; since 1995)
 Shenyang Television (Shenyang, China)

See also
List of South Korean broadcasting networks
Communications in South Korea
SBS (Korea)

External links
 

Seoul Broadcasting System affiliates
Broadcasting companies of South Korea
Mass media in Daegu
Radio stations in South Korea
Television channels in South Korea
Mass media companies of South Korea
Television channels and stations established in 1994
Companies listed on KOSDAQ